Tabarak Husain (April 6, 1924 – April 29, 2018) was a former Bangladeshi career diplomat. He was foreign secretary of Bangladesh from 1975 to 1978. He also held the position of chairman of Sadharan Bima Corporation and Grameen Bank.

Early life and education 
Husain completed his undergraduate degree and post graduation in Economics from University of Dhaka in 1942. He then obtained his postgraduate degree in International Relations from London School of Economics, United Kingdom in 1949.

Personal life 
Husain married Uzra Husain (d. 2011), daughter of Justice Amin Ahmed. Several of Uzra's sisters were married to Pakistani foreign service officers. They had three sons Riaz Husain, Jamil Husain and Taher Husain.

Career

Pakistan period 
Husain joined the Pakistan Foreign Service as a member of the first regular batch in 1949. He served in different positions in the Pakistan diplomatic missions in India, The Netherlands, United Kingdom and Thailand. He was acting high commissioner of Pakistan in New Delhi from 1961 to 1964. In 1968, he was appointed as director general in the Pakistan Ministry of Foreign Affairs with Ambassadorial rank. He was appointed as ambassador to Algeria in 1971 but due to Independence movement of Bangladesh, he was detained in Karachi, Pakistan. He accompanied Zulfikar Ali Bhutto on a state delegation to Peking (present Beijing) in November 1971.

Bangladesh period 
Husain was repatriated from Pakistan in late 1973. Since then he worked in Ministry of Foreign Affairs in various positions. He was reportedly selected to be Bangladesh's ambassador to Cairo before the coup of August 15. He served as Foreign Secretary, of Government of Bangladesh from 15 November 1975 to 6 September 1978. During the period, he visited summit level meetings in nine countries on bilateral visits. He also visited Moscow twice in November 1975 and 1976 as a single member delegation to discuss bilateral issues. For the period of 1978–1982, He was ambassador of Bangladesh to United States of America. In his tenure, President Ziaur Rahman visited in United States in 1980.
Husain signed the Nuclear Non-Proliferation Treaty for Bangladesh on 5 October 1979.
Later, he was the chairman of Sadharan Bima Corporation from 1995 to 1996 and Grameen Bank from 2003 to 2010.

Writing 
Husain authored Serving the Nation: Reflections of Bangladesh Diplomats, a compilation of the memoirs of 43 career diplomats.

Awards 
Husain was awarded the Sitara-i-Khidmat (Star of Service) honor by Pakistan in 1968.

Death 
Husain died at the age of 94 at his sleep on 29 April 2018 in Rockville near Washington, DC.

See also 
 Abul Ahsan
 Hosen Ali
 Farooq Sobhan

References

External links 
 Interview with Tabarak Hossain,  in Voice of America Bangla, 21 October 2006.
 List of Ambassadors of Bangladesh in United States of America.

1924 births
2018 deaths
University of Dhaka alumni
Alumni of the London School of Economics
Bangladeshi diplomats
Ambassadors of Bangladesh to the United States
Ambassadors of Pakistan to Algeria
Bangladeshi expatriates in the United States
People from Noakhali District
Foreign Secretaries of Bangladesh
Pakistani expatriates in the United Kingdom
Pakistani expatriates in India
Pakistani expatriates in Thailand
Pakistani expatriates in the Netherlands